Atapattu Walawwa is a large colonial era manor house situated at 35 Lower Dickson Road, Walawwatta, Galle, Sri Lanka.

The walawwa was constructed by Mudaliyar Don Bastian Gooneratne in 1742. The Walawwa has been the ancestral home of Gooneratne family, who were administrators of the Dutch and British colonial governments. Notable past residents of Atapattu Walawwa includes Mudaliyar Edmund Rowland Gooneratne and his son Mark Gooneratne. It is currently being used as a small seven-room boutique hotel.

On 13 December 1998 the building was formally recognised by the Government as an Archaeological Protected Monument.

References

Further reading

External links
Atapattu Walawwa

Manor houses in Sri Lanka
Houses completed in 1742
Houses in Galle
History of Galle
1742 establishments in Asia
18th-century establishments in Sri Lanka
1742 establishments in the Dutch Empire
Archaeological protected monuments in Galle District